Soyuz-13 Rock is a nunatak, 1270 m, located 2 nautical miles (3.7 km) southeast of Schoonmaker Ridge in the Cook Mountains. Named after the Soviet spacecraft Soyuz 13 of December 18, 1973.

Nunataks of Oates Land